Destiny Road is an album by the British blues band the Peter Green Splinter Group, led by Peter Green. Released in 1999, this was their fourth album. Green was the founder of Fleetwood Mac and a member of that group from 1967–70, before a sporadic solo career during the late 1970s and early 1980s.

The album included a reworking of "Tribal Dance", which first featured on Green's 1979 solo album In the Skies, and also a new version of the Fleetwood Mac hit "Man of the World".

Track listing
"Big Change Is Gonna Come" (Roger Cotton) – 5:04
"Say that You Want To" (Pete Stroud) – 4:02
"Heart of Stone" (Cotton) – 4:43
"You'll Be Sorry Someday" (Cotton) – 6:32
"Tribal Dance" (Peter Green) – 5:31
"Burglar" (Nigel Watson) – 5:55
"Turn Your Love Away" (Stroud) – 5:20
"Madison Blues" (Elmore James) – 3:40
"I Can't Help Myself" (Watson) – 7:00
"Indians" (Watson) – 4:59
"Hiding in Shadows" (Cotton) – 4:41
"There's a River" (Steve Winwood, Will Jennings) – 8:43
"Man of the World" (Green)

Track 13 is a hidden track.
Japanese versions of the album contained two extra tracks: "The Brave" and "Gambling Man".

Personnel

Peter Green Splinter Group
 Peter Green – guitars, harmonica, vocals
 Nigel Watson – guitars, mandolin, vocals
 Roger Cotton – piano
 Pete Stroud – bass guitar
 Larry Tolfree – drums, congas, percussion

Additional musicians
 Jennie Evans, Debbie Miller – backing vocals
 Derek Nash, Joe Green – tenor saxophone
 Kate Shortt, Guy Theaker, Malcolm Allison, Naomi Fairhurst – strings

Technical
 Pete Brown and the Splinter Group – producers
 Matthew Ollivier – engineer
 Richard Wheatley – assistant engineer
 9th Planet, London – design

References

1999 albums
Peter Green Splinter Group albums